Budakeling or Bude Keling is a village located in Bebandem District in Bali, Indonesia. The village is 617 mile (993 km) long. The postal code of Budakeling is 80861.

History 
It was founded by Danghyang Astapaka in 1416 Çaka or 1494 AD

Administration 
Official Administration, Budakeling is divided into 8 Banjar:
 Official Banjar Triwangsa
 Official Banjar Budakeling
 Official Banjar Saren Kauh
 Official Banjar Saren Kangin
 Official Banjar Saren Anyar
 Official Banjar Dukuh
 Official Banjar Pesawan
 Official Banjar Saren Jawa

By Adat, Budakeling Village is split into two Desa Pakraman and one Kampung:

Desa Pakraman Budakeling
 Banjar Gede Jina Murti.
 Banjar Tilem.
 Banjar Pande Mas.
 Banjar Pande Besi.

Desa Pakraman Saren
 Banjar Saren Kauh
 Banjar Saren Kangin
 Banjar Saren Anyar
 Banjar Dukuh
 Banjar Pesawan

Kampung Saren Jawa

Tourism 
Budakeling is home to a Shiva-Buddhist community, dating from at least the 15th century and is home to many artisans. These are some tourist spots you can reach at Budakeling village:

Traditional gold and silver smith
Traditional iron smith
Sunrise view at hill
Terraces rice paddy
Ngusaba Dalem at Pura Dalem Budakeling and Pura Dalem Saren (can see many traditional dance)
Ter-teran or Terteran rites

Gallery

References

Villages in Bali